This article shows the rosters of all participating teams at the 2021 FIVB Volleyball Women's Club World Championship in Ankara, Turkey.

Altay VC
The following is the roster of the Kazakhstani club Altay VC in the 2021 FIVB Volleyball Women's Club World Championship.

Dentil Praia Clube
The following is the roster of the Brazilian club Dentil Praia Clube in the 2021 FIVB Volleyball Women's Club World Championship.

Fenerbahçe Opet İstanbul
The following is the roster of the Turkish club Fenerbahçe Opet İstanbul in the 2021 FIVB Volleyball Women's Club World Championship.

Imoco Volley Conegliano
The following is the roster of the Italian club Imoco Volley Conegliano in the 2021 FIVB Volleyball Women's Club World Championship.

Itambé Minas
The following is the roster of the Brazilian club Itambé Minas in the 2021 FIVB Volleyball Women's Club World Championship.

VakıfBank İstanbul
The following is the roster of the Turkish club VakıfBank İstanbul in the 2021 FIVB Volleyball Women's Club World Championship.

References

Club
FIVB